Pocahontas Mounds (22 HI 500) is an archaeological site from the Plaquemine Mississippian culture in Hinds County, Mississippi, dating from 800 to 1300 CE. Two mounds from the site were added to the NRHP on two separate occasions, Pocahontas Mound A on November 25, 1969 as NRIS number 69000365 and Pocahontas Mound B on April 11, 1972 as NRIS number 72000694. The mounds are listed on the Mississippi Mound Trail.

Description
The site consists of two mounds, a rectangular platform mound and a mortuary mound, and an associated village area. The site was occupied from 800 to 1300 CE by peoples of the Coles Creek and Plaquemine Mississippian cultures, although evidence found during excavations in 2004 showed that the site was occupied briefly in the Middle-Late Archaic period about 4000-1000 BCE. Archaeological investigations found the remains of a typical Mississippian-period thatched, clay-plastered log-post structure on the mounds summit, which was once a ceremonial temple or residence of a chief.

At the time of Ford's writing Mound B was included within the grounds of a local school and could not be excavated. Various kinds of artifacts have been recovered from the site through site survey collections and excavations, including Mississippian-culture copper ear-spools, Mississippian culture pottery, flint chips and numerous burials in the surrounding fields. A fragmentary bird effigy bowl and a human effigy ceramic pipe were found at the burial mound by children from the school. The pottery found at the site is very similar to that found at the Anna site.

New excavations took place in June 2004 under the direction of Jeffrey Alvey for the Cobb Institute of Archaeology and funded by the Mississippi Department of Transportation. In 2008, a roadside park was opened at Mound A as a combined rest stop area and educational center explaining the site’s cultural and historical importance.

Location
The site is used as a roadside park along U.S. Route 49, near its junction with Interstate 220.

References

External links
 Indian Mounds in Mississippi
 Pocahontas Indian Mound
 Historical Marker Society of America - Pocahontas Mounds
 Pocahontas Mounds on Flickr

Plaquemine Mississippian culture
Mounds in Mississippi
Geography of Hinds County, Mississippi
Tourist attractions in Hinds County, Mississippi
Archaeological sites on the National Register of Historic Places in Mississippi
Roadside parks